Michael Delfino is a fictional character on the ABC television series Desperate Housewives. The character was played by actor James Denton from the show's inception, until the eighth and final season of the show.

Storylines

Backstory
Michael "Mike" Delfino was born in 1967 as the second child of Adele and Nick Delfino. He was engaged to Deirdre Taylor. He was very popular in High School until his father’s trial for the murder of his co-worker. Since then, his maternal grandfather took care of him and Adele. Unfortunately, he fell into drug addiction and Mike, defending a woman against a policeman, killed him in self-defense. In 1987 he was sentenced to 5 and a half years in prison in Kansas. In September 1988, his girlfriend Deirdre visited him in prison and they conceived a son during the meeting. Deirdre later lied to him that she carried out the abortion and then disappeared from his life. In 1992, he moved to Los Angeles and got married. The woman died in 2003. They had no children but left him a dog named Bongo. He came to Fairview because there were nightmares. He was hired by Deirdre's father as a private investigator to find out what happened with Deirdre.

Season 1 
Mike Delfino lives at 4356 Wisteria Lane, renting the Simms’s house, and poses as the friendly neighborhood plumber. He was quietly searching for his missing ex-girlfriend (Deirdre Taylor). Her father, Noah, wanted to know what had happened to her before he died. Deirdre's remains are inside Zach’s toy chest, and are buried under the family pool. After Mary Alice kills herself, Paul Young excavates the toy chest out of the pool, wraps it, and tapes it up, and drives away with it to throw it in a body of water. The toy chest later comes up and is mentioned twice more when it appears on a local News channel. Paul is shown in his living room, while Zach sleeps on the couch, and the story comes on the News, making Paul quickly turn off the tv, and storm out of the room. Zach is seen opening his eyes, and realizes something is not right. In episode 18, two detectives having discovered a woman's remains in the toy chest, question Paul about it as they have found the maker kept a list of all clients he had done work for. Zach steps in and falsely claims the chest was damaged by him and thrown away when he was a child. Zach later believes Paul has lied to him about his memories of the chest and the private investigator who tried to take Zach away when he was a young child but Paul convinces him he didn't.

Paul Young murdered Martha Huber after she admitted blackmailing his late wife. He tried framing Mike for the murder. Susan Meyer discovers that Mike had been in prison for manslaughter, and drug dealing. Devastated, she ends their relationship, disappointed that he didn't tell her the truth. However, she visited Kendra and Noah, looking for more answers. Kendra explains that Mike and Deirdre were drug addicts. Mike was defending Deirdre from an undercover policeman, and he tried stopping the policeman who had caught them together. Mike and the policeman got into a fight, and they went over a balcony. Mike survived, but the cop didn't.

Mike discovers that Paul Young was involved in Deirdre's murder. He took Paul hostage and planned to shoot him until Paul told him that he, and his late wife, Mary Alice, lived in Salt Lake City years ago. Mary Alice Young worked at a rehab center and met Deirdre. One night, wanting drugs, Deirdre tried to sell them her watch, claiming the baby needed food, but Mary Alice knew Deirdre would buy drugs, so she refused. Deirdre then offered them her baby son, Dana. Mary Alice agreed since she couldn’t conceive, and they moved to Fairview with the baby, now renamed Zach. Four years later, Deirdre found them and demanded her baby back, but they refused. Deirdre went to take Zach, but Mary Alice stabbed her in the process. They cut up her body, and put it inside Zach’s toy chest, and buried it underneath the pool they were about to have installed. Mike let Paul go, realizing Zach was his son. Meanwhile, Zach was holding Susan hostage because he had just found out Mike kidnapped Paul and intended to kill him.

Season 2 
When Mike got home, he and Susan fought off Zach and he fled because Zach was keeping Susan so Mike would come home and Zach intended to kill him. Susan was stunned to discover that Zach is Mike's son. Susan was wary of Zach because his behaviour towards Julie was worrying, particularly when she asked him not to see Julie as much. She encouraged Zach to go to Utah, looking for Paul and gave him money. When Mike found out, he ended their relationship.

Mike tried getting to know him, on his return from Utah, and Zach was initially interested. Paul, however, told Zach that he was getting tired of his obsession with two people who hadn't loved him enough to keep him. After that, Zach made it clear that he felt Paul was his father.

After Edie Britt set Susan's house on fire, Mike got Susan a wire to record Edie's confession. Susan moved into a caravan. Later, they made up and he planned to propose in the season finale but was run over by Orson Hodge.

Season 3 
Mike survived the accident but spent 6 months in the Fairview hospital. When he woke up, he was diagnosed with retrograde amnesia, causing him to forget the last 2 years. Edie Britt took advantage, telling him that Susan had treated him like dirt to make Mike fall in love with her. They had a brief relationship which she ended when he was arrested for Monique Polier's murder. Susan pursued her new boyfriend, Ian, to hire the best lawyer to get Mike out of jail. In prison, Paul tried befriending Mike so Zach would help him find Felicia Tilman (Mrs. Hubers' sister), who had accused Paul murdering her sister. Later, he visited a hypnotherapist to try to make sense of some memories. He realized Orson Hodge (who married Bree Van De Kamp) was responsible. He and Mike had a fight on the hospital roof and Orson fell off. Mike was cleared when the police found Alma and Monique's teeth and suicide note Alma wrote when she pretended to die.

Mike was saddened when Ian and Susan got engaged but discovered that Ian proposed, knowing that Mike had intended to propose the night of his accident. Mike challenged Ian at a poker game and they did a deal: if Mike won, he could tell Susan but if Ian won, he couldn't. Ian won and Mike kept his distance but Ian had to thank Mike when he rescued him from drowning. Following an argument with Ian, Mike consoled Susan and they kissed, renewing Mike's hope that they would reconcile. Despite his deal with Ian, he told Susan what happened at the poker game. Susan was furious, refusing to see either of them but eventually decided to marry Ian. With broken Heart, Mike left her a message, saying goodbye and left Wisteria Lane, unaware that Ian had ended things with Susan. Mike went camping so Susan went after him but offended by her guide's suggestion that she invited in too much drama, Susan went to find Mike alone. Back at the campground, she was reported lost, and Mike recognized Susan from the description. Susan left Mike a message, promising if they reconciled, they would be a normal couple. Mike found Susan and they went home. Exactly a year to the day after Mike's accident, they went out to dinner and on returning to Wisteria Lane, the trailer Susan decorated a year before, was waiting on her driveway. They lived the experience they were meant to have that night and Mike proposed.

They married in the woods in the middle of the night. Susan surprised him with a small wedding because she didn't want to put pressure on him for a big, expensive wedding.

Season 4 
In Season Four, Mike and Susan discovered that she was pregnant. Mike told Susan that he had never been happier but problems arose when Julie asked for permission to go to a party. Susan agreed but Mike said no as he'd seen some crazy parties at the house in question. Susan agreed with Mike but later told Julie she could go but asked her not to tell Mike, wanting him to feel part of the decision-making process, and Julie went. Later that night, after Mike said he had driven past the house and seen topless girls, drunken people and music blaring, Susan claimed she needed something from the store and went to get Julie. However, at the party, she was mistaken for a stripper but brought Julie and Dylan home and a friend of Julie's phoned to check she'd got home all right, alerting Mike. He told Susan that he respected her decisions about how to raise Julie but expected her to consult him on how they raised their child.

The doctor suggested Susan and Mike go for genetic counselling and Mike admitted his father, Nick, was alive and in prison for first degree murder. They visited and Susan was shocked by how cold Nick was and needing to know that Nick felt remorse for his actions, visited him alone the next day.
Nick told Susan that he regretted what his actions did to Mike as he became very unpopular, claiming that one never truly overcame that, and told Susan to watch Mike carefully.
While at Bree's house, Mike dropped a painkiller. Bree found it and wondering what it was, researched it. On discovering that it was highly addictive, she told Susan who only believed it when she found pills hidden in Mike's flashlight. She confronted him and he threw the pills down the sink, telling her that he wasn't addicted but later retrieved them. Mike's drug dealer hassled him for money so he blackmailed Adam and Orson into prescribing him more. Mike's drug dealer came to the house and Susan, unaware he was a drug dealer, tried fixing him up with Julie until Mike told her that he was a drug dealer and she threw him out. He confessed that he had bought drugs illegally from the dealer so he could keep working, worried about the cost of raising a child. Susan thought that he had stopped taking them but found pills in the car. She confronted Mike and he accidentally pushed her down the stairs. They went to the hospital — worried about the baby — but punched a hospital worker so Mike was handcuffed to a seat. Luckily she and the baby were fine and Susan's ankle was only sprained. She was prescribed painkillers and when Mike asked for one, she told him if he didn't go to rehab, she would leave him and refuse him access to the baby. Mike agreed and went for thirty days.

Mike didn't go to the first Lamaze class, as he received his 30-day chip (30 days without drugs) but was there for the second. Mike told Susan that Bree Hodge's husband, Orson, had run him over, Susan furiously told Orson to stay away from her family and told Bree what happened. Orson and Bree grew apart because of this, and Susan apologized for it. After Mike's mother visited, Mike scolded his mother for her attitude towards Susan — asking personal questions and unable to believe that Susan couldn't cook. She apologized just before Susan gave birth to their baby boy. Mike wanted to name him Maynard after his maternal grandfather (who was a father figure for him) but Susan preferred Connor. Mike convinced her to name their son Maynard James Delfino (M.J. for short), honoring both of Mike's grandparents.

5-year leap 
As the plot fast forwards 5 years in the future, Susan is seen coming home to a man who is not Mike.

Season 5 
As previously stated, season five takes place five years after the events of season four. In the new timeline, it is revealed that Susan is having a secret relationship with her painter/decorator Jackson Braddock. When Jackson asked why they couldn't go public, she replies, "Maybe I don’t deserve to be happy," which led to flashbacks revealing why Susan and Mike divorced: they were involved in a crash with another car. They survived but the occupants of the other car — Lila Dash and her daughter, Paige — died. Susan and Mike weren't responsible (the other car pulled out in front of them), but Susan blamed herself and Mike and the trauma took its toll on their marriage. When Mike arrives to collect their son ("M.J.") for the weekend, Susan tells Mike that she is seeing someone.

While Susan is now with Jackson, Mike started dating Katherine Mayfair, Susan's older friend. Mike and Katherine bonded over after bad dates and realize they are attracted to each other. When Susan finds out that they are dating and that Bree knew, it is clear that she still has feelings for Mike, whom she refers to as her. This bad feeling spills over into Mike and Susan's son, M.J., when he attacks Katherine (he threw chewed chewing gum on Katherine's head). It emerges that this is a result of what Susan told M.J. when she and Mike first split up; that they would get back together eventually.

Worried about her and Mike's relationship, Katherine tells him that her daughter wants her to move to Maryland, but isn't sure if she should go. Mike was non-committal but realized, thanks to Dave Williams (AKA David Dash), that he was falling in love with Katherine and left her a basket of roses with a note saying "Don't go". When Katherine found them, she was thrilled — unaware that Dave had an agenda of his own, thinking Mike was responsible for the deaths of his wife and daughter. Dave planned his revenge — he, Mike and Katherine would go camping and he would shoot Katherine dead. Fortunately, Dave's wife, Edie, sent him a text, telling him to come home. Edie confronts him — during the confrontation, Edie is about to call Mike when Dave nearly strangles her. Edie rushed out and was killed after being electrocuted when she crashed her car into an electricity pole after swerving to avoid Orson. Dave later learns that he nearly killed the wrong person. Susan confessed she was driving the night that Lila and Paige died and realized he should have been targeting her. Dave decides to kill Susan and Mike's six-year-old son, M.J. Delfino, in revenge.

Mike later struggled with his feelings for Susan and Katherine, and proposes to Katherine, who gladly accepts. In the finale, Dave gives Mike a videotape which he says is rehearsal footage of their band; it is actually Dave's confession which Mike wasn't supposed to see until after M.J. is dead. Needing a videotape to use at the wedding, Katherine puts it in her camera. Katherine and Mike are waiting to fly to Vegas and Katherine takes her wallet to buy cappuccinos and knocked the camera so Mike heard Dave's voice from her purse. Watching it, he sees Dave confess to killing M.J.. Mike runs to save him, and asks a passenger to inform Katherine that he left due to an emergency. Unfortunately, it is misinterpreted. Mike phones Susan and told her that Dave is the man whose wife and daughter that died in the accident. He speaks to Dave, offering himself in Susan and M.J.'s place. Dave agrees and tells Mike to meet them at the site of the accident. Unknown to Mike, Dave plans to have Mike crash into his car and kill M.J., just as Susan did when she killed Lila and Paige. Susan manages to escape and tried to warn Mike, but he crashed into Dave's car anyway. Susan was relieved to find M.J. alive as Dave had told him to get out of the car. Susan, Mike, and M.J. share a hug, and Mike kisses Susan.

At the end of the finale, Mike is seen marrying someone whose face is not shown.

Season 6 
It is revealed that Mike broke up with Katherine and asked Susan to marry him, again. She accepts and they plan their wedding. Her daughter, Julie, then returns to Wisteria Lane. Though Susan is happy and in love with Mike, Katherine is devastated and jealous. Their friendship is deeply scarred by this. At the ceremony, Katherine approaches Susan and explains how she feels and asks for her to make a public apology during the ceremony or she will make a huge scene. Susan then locks Katherine in a closet, she breaks out and a scene ensues after Mike and Susan are wed. Susan then apologizes publicly. However, Katherine tells her it doesn't matter because as of this moment, they are at war and she begins to plot revenge. When Katherine tells M.J. how Susan stole Mike away and takes the child from school, Mike verbally blasts her, saying he never loved Katherine and was thinking of Susan the whole time they were together. When a hurt Katherine says it'd be less painful for Mike to stab her with a knife, he retorts that he doesn't care enough about Katherine to kill her. After he leaves, Katherine calls 911 to say she's losing blood and then stabs herself. Katherine tells the police that Mike stabbed her and he's arrested. Trying to help him, Susan calls on Katherine's daughter Dylan, who's believed Katherine's tales that she's married to Mike. After talking to Mike in jail, Dylan realizes her mother has been lying and confronts her, causing Katherine to have a full breakdown that presumably exonerates Mike. Mike is currently having financial problems, but while he refuses any help coming from Susan, he takes a loan from Carlos. Susan eventually learns of their financial ruin and, after going over their finances she and Mike realize they need to cut back. This includes them moving to an apartment across town and, renting out their home. Though Mike knows it will help them get back on their feet, Susan becomes very angry with him as she is forced to leave the house where she raised her children. Though they make up and leave Wisteria Lane, they quickly find a renter for their house. The renter is an old resident of Wisteria Lane, Paul Young.

Season 7 
When Susan tells Mike about her lingerie job on the Internet and Paul Young's plan to buy their house, Mike decides to take an oil rig job in Alaska in order to earn more money. He has also been communicating with Felicia Tilman. When Susan develops kidney problems Mike surprises her at the hospital. They both fear the prospect of Susan succumbing to her disease and so they decide to have an early anniversary which turns into a sham. After everything backfires Mike admits he's not ready to lose Susan and tells her that she'll find a kidney donor. After Paul recovers from the gunshot wound he asks for Mike's help in finding Zach. Mike rejects but later changes his mind when he realizes that Zach is on drugs. Both Mike and Paul visit Zach and ask him to go to rehab. When Susan gets a kidney, courtesy of Beth, they both cannot wait for their sex drought to end with Susan dreaming of having sex but cannot recall her male counterpart.

Season 8 
Making the fatal mistake of crossing Donny, an unruly and vengeful loan shark/extortionist who harasses Renee, Mike is killed in a drive-by shooting by Donny himself in front of his home on Wisteria Lane, just seconds after expressing his love toward Susan. He pushes Susan down to the ground in order to save her while he is shot in the chest. He is then remembered by the housewives at his funeral. The fate of Mike's killer is never shown afterwards, but Bree is later told that an arrest had been made. When Susan was cleaning out Mike's closet, she finds papers indicating that Mike was writing checks to a woman. Susan visits the address she finds in Mike's things and discovers that Mike had a sister, Laura, whom he only learned about eight years before. Mike's mother did not want to be "inconvenienced" by their special needs child. In the final moments of the series, as Susan leaves Wisteria Lane, Mike is among the spirits watching her go.

Characterization and casting  
Marc Cherry observed that the mystery surrounding Mike made him alluring and initially wanted to cast an Italian actor to portray him. Cherry settled with James Denton because he found him wholesome: "We think he's a good guy, and we want him to be a good guy, but he's not acting like a good guy."
Mike is introduced as the new neighbor on Wisteria Lane with a mysterious past. Denton explains, "He's on a very personal mission. He's not a cop or a private eye. Mike is there because somebody in his past has done him wrong."

In 2005, Denton stated that he knew his importance to the series was tied to Teri Hatcher and that there was no guarantee he would kept onboard. Denton furthered, “In a perfect world. I’ll get four more years out of Desperate Housewives, and then nobody will ever see me again." Denton admitted to not being a fan of the time-skip between seasons four and five before eventually coming around: "I thought it was gimmicky, and even Marc admitted he sort of stole it. But I realized they were right. So that’s why I’m not a writer."

In August 2011, ABC president Paul Lee confirmed the eighth season of Desperate Housewives would be the show's last. Denton believed Cherry "had a pretty good feel for when the show was going to end based on the first couple of episodes that felt so much like season one in terms of dealing with the same kind of note from the pilot" and that he personally had a feeling the show was ending before it was officially announced. Denton observed that by the eighth season, "Mike and Susan are pretty secure and If they broke up it would really surprise me. I think it’s much more interesting for the writers, now that they’ve got them together after all these years, to watch them deal with these crazy situations in a realistic way that couples all across the country have to face all the time."

Reception 
Screen Rant ranked Mike's death as the most emotional of the series, and added that the "fact that Mike's ghost is looking on as Susan says goodbye to Wisteria Lane makes this even more tragic and beautiful."
When they ranked the seasons of the series, Screen Rant cited "the pointless decision to kill off Mike Delfino so close to the show’s end" as the reason the eighth season lost major points.
Christina Tran wrote that she was still in denial about Mike's death even after knowing it would happen due to her fondness for the character: "Aside from the core four, Mike was the last person I wanted to see go."

References 

Desperate Housewives characters
Fictional plumbers
Television characters introduced in 2004
Fictional drug addicts